Owen Jenkins may refer to:

 Owen Jenkins (diplomat), British diplomat
 Owen Jenkins (priest) (1906–1988), Welsh Anglican priest
 Owen Jenkins (rugby union) (born 1993), Welsh rugby union player
 Glyn Jenkins (Owen Glyndwr Jenkins, 1927–2014), Australian politician